Teruggite is a mineral with the chemical formula Ca4MgAs2B12O22(OH)12·12H2O. It is colorless. Its crystals are monoclinic prismatic. It is transparent. It is not radioactive. It has vitreous luster. Teruggite is rated 2.5 on the Mohs Scale of hardness.

References

Webmineral data
Mindat.org
Handbook of Mineralogy

Calcium minerals
Magnesium minerals
Arsenic minerals
Nesoborates
Monoclinic minerals
Minerals in space group 14